The 144th district of the Texas House of Representatives contains parts of Houston, South Houston, and Pasadena. The current Representative is Mary Ann Perez, who has represented the district since 2017.

References 

144